= PDBbind database =

The PDBbind database is a comprehensive collection of experimentally measured binding affinity data (Kd, Ki, and IC50) for the protein-ligand complexes deposited in the Protein Data Bank (PDB). It thus provides a link between energetic and structural information of protein-ligand complexes, which is of great value to various studies on molecular recognition occurred in biological systems.

== History ==
The aim of the PDBbind database is to provide a comprehensive collection of the experimentally measured binding affinity data for all types of biomolecular complexes deposited in the Protein Data Bank (PDB). It thus provides a linkage between energetic and structural information of these complexes, which may be used for various studies on molecular recognition occurred in biological systems.

The PDBbind database was first released to the public in May, 2004.

== Current release ==
The PDBbind database is updated on an annual basis to keep up with the growth of the Protein Data Bank. The current release, i.e. version 2014, is based on the contents of Protein Data Bank released on Jan 1st, 2014.

This release provides two basic types of information:

1. Basic information of ~13000 complex structures formed between protein-small molecule ligand, protein-protein, protein-nucleic acid and nucleic acid-small molecule ligand. The user can display and examine these complex structures on-line. The user can also search through the chemical structures of the ligand molecules included in these complexes.
2. Binding affinity data and structural information for a total of 12,995 biomolecular complexes, including protein-ligand (10656), nucleic acid-ligand (87), protein-nucleic acid (660), and protein-protein complexes (1592), which is the largest collection of this kind so far. Binding data included in version 2014 have increased by 20% as compared to version 2013. All of these data are collected from >28,000 original references by the PDBbind team. They all have been double-checked to ensure that they match the complex structures in the Protein Data Bank. Moreover, a "refined set" and a "core set" are compiled as high-quality data sets of protein-ligand complexes for docking/scoring studies.
